Christopher "Deep" Henderson is an American music composer, arranger, and producer.  In a musical career spanning over a decade, he has worked with such artists as Mýa, R. Kelly, Jene, Trey Songz, and Jamie Foxx.  He is one of the composers and the producer of Jamie Foxx's grammy-winning "Blame It".

Early life
Henderson grew up in the Detroit area.  As a teenager, Henderson performed as a vocalist with many local R&B acts. Raised in a family that valued education, Henderson began attending Hampton University at the age of 16 in an early entry program for gifted students. His nickname, "Deep", refers to a common description of young Henderson's lyrics. He credits Motown and exposure to multi-instrumentalist vocalists/composers such as Stevie Wonder and Prince with great influence on his musical aspirations.

Early career
Henderson's first songwriting and production credit, "Happily Ever After" for R&B singer Case, became one of the Top 10 songs of 1999. Consequently, Billboard magazine recognized him as one of the top 20 hot R&B/Hip-Hop producers that year.

Discography/Credits

Awards/Nominations

References

American music arrangers
Living people
1973 births